Yoshinobu Launch Complex (LC-Y) is a rocket launch site at the Tanegashima Space Center on Tanegashima. The site and its collection of facilities were originally built for the H-II launch vehicle and later used for H-IIA and H-IIB launches.

It is the most Northern launch complex at Tanegashima, and along with the now inactive Osaki Launch Complex used for orbital launches. The Yoshinobu Launch Complex consists of two launch pads. The complex also contains a test stand for firing the LE-7 engines used in the first stage of the H-II and its derivatives. Prior to launch, rockets are processed vertically in the complex's vehicle assembly building. The rocket is rolled out to the launch pad on a mobile launcher platform about twelve hours before it is scheduled to launch. It takes around thirty minutes to transport the rocket from the assembly building to Pad 1.

See also

References 

Space program of Japan
Spaceports